Arknath Chaudhary is an Indian scholar of Sanskrit. He served Central Sanskrit University as Director and Shree Somnath Sanskrit University, Veraval, Gujarat as Vice-Chancellor.

Career
Chaudhary is a specialist in Sanskrit Vyakaran.

He served three campuses of Rashtriya Sanskrit Sansthan as Principal.

Chaudhary comes from Rudrapur village in the Madhubani district of Bihar state in India. He served several organizations in Jharkhand, Andhra Pradesha, Himachal Pradesh, Punjab, Maharasthra, Gujarat and Rajasthan.

Chaudhary spent a lengthy tenure with Rasthriya Sanskrit Sansthan, Jaipur where he joined as lecturer and was promoted to Professor and Principal. He was given charge of Rashtriya Sanskrit Sansthan, Mumbai and Rashtriya Sanskrit Sansthan, Lucknow later. He organized the biggest Sanskrit conference in association with the Ministry of HRD, Govt. of India.

Education 
Chaudhary is an Acharya in Vyakararan and MA in Darshan Shashtra. He was university topper in Darshan Shashtra.

Publications
He has written over 21 books filling more than 8,000 pages, and published 35 research papers on the subjects of Vyakaran, Sahitya, Darshan, Tantra and Ved.

Some of the popular titles published by Dr. Chaudhary are:
 Laghu Siddhant Kaumudi vyakhya
 Madhya Siddhant Kaumudi vyakhya
 Vaiyakaran Kaumudi vyakhya 
 Meghadootam (Translation)
 Nitishatakam
 Tarkbhasha
 Tarksangrah
 Lalita Sahasranamw
 Nighantu Shabdkosh

Awards and recognition
 Sanskrit Shiksha, awarded by Governor of Rajasthan, on behalf of MHRD, Govt. of Rajasthan in July 2012.
 Veereshwar Shashtri Vyakaran Samman, awarded by Chief Minister, Rajasthan, on behalf of Rajasthan Sanskrit Academy.
 Shiksha Ratna Award, awarded by Governor of Gujarat, on behalf of Akashdeep Group of Schools and Colleges.
 Shashtra Mahodadhi Award, by Vedic Sanskriti Sangh, Jaipur.
 Nimbark Sanskriti Award, awarded by Education Minister, Govt. of Rajasthan, on behalf of Hariseva Sanskrit Samiti, Bhilwara.

References

External links
 
 
 
 
 
 
 
 
 
 
 
 

Living people
Year of birth missing (living people)
Indian Sanskrit scholars
People from Madhubani district
Scholars from Bihar